Le Champ-près-Froges (literally Le Champ near Froges) is a commune in the Isère department in southeastern France. It is part of the Grenoble urban unit (agglomeration).

Population

See also
Communes of the Isère department

References

Communes of Isère